Sugo Dam  is an earthfill dam located in Miyagi Prefecture in Japan. The dam is used for irrigation. The catchment area of the dam is 4.3 km2. The dam impounds about 18  ha of land when full and can store 1500 thousand cubic meters of water. The construction of the dam was started on 1975 and completed in 1997.

See also
List of dams in Japan

References

Dams in Miyagi Prefecture